Hermione (minor planet designation: 121 Hermione) is a very large binary asteroid discovered in 1872. It orbits in the Cybele group in the far outer asteroid belt. As an asteroid of the dark C spectral type, it is probably composed of carbonaceous materials. In 2002, a small moon was found to be orbiting Hermione.

Discovery 
Hermione was discovered by J. C. Watson on 12 May 1872 from Ann Arbor, Michigan, in the United States, and named after Hermione, daughter of Menelaus and Helen in Greek mythology.

Physical properties 

The asteroid has a bi-lobed shape, as evidenced by adaptive optics images, the first of which were taken in December 2003 with the Keck telescope. Of several proposed shape models that agreed with the images, a "snowman"-like shape was found to best fit the observed precession rate of Hermione's satellite. In this "snowman" model, the asteroid's shape can be approximated by two partially overlapping spheres of radii 80 and 60 km, whose centers are separated by a distance of 115 km. A simple ellipsoid shape was ruled out.

Observation of the satellite's orbit has made possible an accurate determination of Hermione's mass. For the best-fit "snowman" model, the density is found to be 1.8 ± 0.2 g/cm3, giving a porosity on the order of 20%, and possibly indicating that the main components are fractured solid bodies, rather than the asteroid being a rubble pile.

Occultations by Hermione have been successfully observed three times so far, the last time in February 2004.

Moon 

A satellite of Hermione was discovered in 2002 with the Keck II telescope. It is about 8 miles (13 km) in diameter. The satellite is provisionally designated S/2002 (121) 1. It has not yet been officially named, but "LaFayette" has been proposed by a group of astronomers in reference to the frigate used in secret by the Marquis de Lafayette to reach America to help the insurgents.

References

External links 
 121 Hermione and S/2002 (121) 1, orbit data website maintained by F. Marchis. Includes adaptive optics images, orbit diagrams, and shape models.
 (121) Hermione, datasheet, johnstonsarchive.net
 Asteroids with Satellites, Robert Johnston, johnstonsarchive.net
Tally of Asteroids Harboring Moons Grows Beyond 30 (Space.com, 3 October 2002)
 
 

000121
Discoveries by James Craig Watson
Named minor planets
000121
000121
000121
000121
18720512